Cuvântul (Romanian for "The Word") may refer to:
 Cuvântul, a daily newspaper published by Nae Ionescu during the 1930s
 Cuvântul (literary magazine)
 Cuvântul (Moldovan newspaper), published in Rezina

See also
Cuvântul Liber (disambiguation)